Hardwicke's pipefish or pallid seahorse (Solegnathus hardwickii) is a species of fish in the family Syngnathidae. It is found in Australia, China, Indonesia, Japan, Malaysia, Mauritius, the Philippines, Thailand, and Vietnam. Its natural habitats are open seas, shallow seas, subtidal aquatic beds, and coral reefs. It is threatened by habitat loss.

Sources

Solegnathus
Fish described in 1830
Taxa named by John Edward Gray
Taxonomy articles created by Polbot